Cracks the Safe is a full-length album released by Haystak on September 2, 2008. The album peaked at 66 on the Billboard R&B/Hip-Hop Albums chart.

Track listing

 "Haystak" - 0:21
 "B.I.G. Till I D.I.E." - 3:54
 "Blessings" - 5:06
 "Who Can Do It Better" - 4:13
 "Bigger Than That" - 4:23
 "Here Go" - 4:24
 "Test Yo Heart" - 4:11
 "Gotta Watch" - 3:45
 "Yall Gone Make Us" - 4:33
 "Im Wit It" - 3:45
 "My Pain" - 3:28
 "H#&& Naw!" - 4:52
 "Im So Tired" - 4:21
 "F@#$ Em!" - 3:45
 "The Hole" - 3:54

References

External links
https://www.amazon.com/Cracks-Safe-Haystak/dp/B001CW7MLK
https://itunes.apple.com/us/album/crack-the-safe/id288081971
http://www.bestbuy.com/site/Cracks-the-Safe-%5BPA%5D---CD/8948179.p?id=1893336&skuId=8948179
http://www.mtv.com/artists/haystak/discography/2325557/
http://www.rhapsody.com/artist/haystak/album/crack-the-safe
http://www.discogs.com/Haystak-Cracks-The-Safe/release/1931773
http://www.cduniverse.com/productinfo.asp?pid=7727500

Haystak albums
2008 albums